The Civil Aviation Administration (CAA) or the Directorate General "Civil Aviation Administration" (DG CAA; , ГД ГВА) is an agency of the government of Bulgaria, headquartered in Sofia. It is within the Ministry of Transport, Information Technology and Communications.

References

External links
 Civil Aviation Administration
 Civil Aviation Administration 

Bulgaria
Government of Bulgaria
Civil aviation in Bulgaria
Transport organizations based in Bulgaria